Moethee Zun (born 1962), also known as Moe Thee Zun, is a leader in the Burmese democratic movement.
Zun is the founder of Burma's Democratic Party for a New Society. Moethee Zun is also the president and the founder of Democratic Federation of Burma, a democratic organization for the liberation and freedom movement in Burma.

As a Rangoon University student then, Zun helped organize the national wide student movement in 1988, and joined 1990 presidential election. After the Burmese military regime took back its power, Zun was forced to leave the country. During the time, he lost his family.

Zun currently resides in the United States. He came to the U.S. under the U.S. government's protection in 2001. During the time, he has been leading Burmese activists to seek support from the international community and to make lobbying to promote the movement. His fellowship allowed him to complete a book documenting his history, called The Struggle for Democracy in Burma.

References

1962 births
Burmese emigrants to the United States
Living people
Burmese democracy activists
Democratic Party for a New Society politicians